401 Light Air Defence Regiment (Composite) (401 Lt AD Regt (Comp)) is an Air Defence regiment of the Indian Army.

Formation 
401 Light AD Regiment (Composite) was raised at Madhopur on 1 June 1988 by Colonel RK Verma.

History 
At raising, the regiment was equipped with ZU-23-2B anti-aircraft twin-barreled autocannons as its main equipment. The unit became a composite regiment in 1992.
Locations
The regiment has varied tenures in high altitude, field, modified field, counter insurgency and peace stations at Udhampur, Nasirabad, Ferozepur, Leh, Siachen, Bangalore, Lalgarh Jattan, Pathankot, Gandhidham and Jodhpur.
Operations
The Regiment has participated in Operation Blackrose, Operation Rakshak I (Jammu and Kashmir), Operation Meghdoot, Operation Rakshak II (Punjab), Operation Dalunag, Operation Vijay and Operation Rakshak III.

The regiment was awarded the General Officer Commanding in Chief’s (Northern Command) unit appreciation for its tenure in Siachen-Kargil sector between 1997-99. The regiment has won 3 Sena Medals, 2 COAS Commendation Cards and 46 GOC-in-C Commendation Cards.

References

Military units and formations established in 1988
Air defence regiments of the Indian Army
Air defence regiments